"I'll Be Satisfied" is a popular song. Recorded and released by Jackie Wilson in 1959, the single peaked at #20 on the Billboard Hot 100, and was a Top 10 R&B hit, peaking at # 6. It was written, like many of Wilson's early hits,  by future Motown founder Berry Gordy along with Gordy's sister Gwendolyn and Roquel "Billy" Davis, writing under his songwriting alias of Tyran Carlo. This up-tempo rocker could best be described as "proto Motown", featuring many of the musical and lyrical features that Gordy would employ on his later recordings for his Motown Records label.

The song was covered by Shakin' Stevens in 1982. It reached no. 10 in the UK chart and no. 5 in the Irish chart.

Charts

Shakin' Stevens version

In 1982, Welsh singer Shakin' Stevens released a cover of the song for his album Give Me Your Heart Tonight. It peaked at number 10 on the UK Singles Chart.

Charts

References

External links

1959 songs
Jackie Wilson songs
Songs written by Berry Gordy
Songs written by Billy Davis (songwriter)
Shakin' Stevens songs